Matthias Legler is an East German bobsledder who competed in the mid-1980s. He won a silver medal in the four-man event at the 1985 FIBT World Championships in Cervinia.

References
Bobsleigh four-man world championship medalists since 1930

German male bobsledders
Living people
Year of birth missing (living people)